Written Communication is a peer-reviewed academic journal that publishes papers in the field of written communication. The current editor-in-chief is Chad Wickman (Auburn University). It was established in 1984 and has published quarterly continuously since then by SAGE Publications . Stephen P. Witte and John Daly were founding editors and Witte remained chief editor until his death in 2004, when Christina Haas took over the editorship.

Abstracting and indexing 
Written Communication is abstracted and indexed in Scopus, and the Social Sciences Citation Index. According to the Journal Citation Reports, its 2017 impact factor is 1.267, ranking it 44 out of 84 journals in the category "Communication".

References

External links 
 

SAGE Publishing academic journals
English-language journals
Communication journals
Publications established in 1984
Quarterly journals